Antonio Marcilla (12 March 1934 – 6 August 2014) is an Argentine boxer. He competed in the men's light welterweight event at the 1956 Summer Olympics.

References

External links
 

1934 births
2014 deaths
Argentine male boxers
Olympic boxers of Argentina
Boxers at the 1956 Summer Olympics
Boxers from Buenos Aires
Light-welterweight boxers